Dynactin 5 (p25) is a protein that in humans is encoded by the DCTN5 gene.

This gene encodes a subunit of dynactin, a component of the cytoplasmic dynein motor machinery involved in minus-end-directed transport. The encoded protein is a component of the pointed-end subcomplex and is thought to bind membranous cargo. A pseudogene of this gene is located on the long arm of chromosome 1. Alternatively spliced transcript variants encoding multiple isoforms have been observed for this gene.

Model organisms

Model organisms have been used in the study of DCTN5 function. A conditional knockout mouse line, called Dctn5tm2a(KOMP)Wtsi was generated as part of the International Knockout Mouse Consortium program — a high-throughput mutagenesis project to generate and distribute animal models of disease to interested scientists.

Male and female animals underwent a standardized phenotypic screen to determine the effects of deletion. Twenty five tests were carried out on mutant mice and three significant abnormalities were observed. No homozygous mutant embryos were identified during gestation, and therefore none survived until weaning. The remaining tests were carried out on heterozygous mutant adult mice and abnormal lens morphology (including cataracts) was observed in female animals.

References

Further reading 
 

Genes mutated in mice